Coquihalla may refer to:

Coquihalla River, British Columbia, Canada
Coquihalla Canyon Provincial Park
Coquihalla River Provincial Park
Coquihalla Summit, British Columbia, Canada
Okanagan—Coquihalla, a former federal electoral district in British Columbia

See also
 British Columbia Highway 5, also known as Coquihalla highway, Canada